Sour Punch is a brand of sour candy, manufactured by American Licorice Company. As one of the first brands to enter the sour candy market in the 1990s, it comes in 5 forms: Straws, Bites, Bits, Ropes, and Twists. Sour Punch comes in 5 different flavors. Like many other sour candies, they are coated with sour sugar to supply the familiar sour flavor. One serving size of Sour Punch twists contains 150 calories. It is often a popular candy for those who are lactose intolerant, as it does not contain any milk products.

Original flavors 
 Chargin' Cherry
 Strikin' Strawberry
 Orange
 Zappin' Apple
 Zip Zappin' Watermelon
 Blue Razmatazz (Blue raspberry)
 Grape
 Discontinued flavors: Lemon (reintroduced in 2015 in the "Rainbow Straws" pack

References

External links 
 Official website
 Sour Punch @ American Licorice Company

American Licorice Company brands